Zee Comedy Show (also known as Zee Comedy Factory) is an Indian Hindi-language comedy television series which premiered on 31 July 2021. The series airs on Zee TV. It is produced by Optimystix Entertainment. The presenters of this show are Farah Khan, Aditya Narayan, Sugandha Mishra, and others. Farah Khan was replaced by Mika Singh temporarily because she tested positive for COVID-19.

References

External links
Official Website
Zee Comedy Show on IMDb

2021 Indian television series debuts
Hindi-language television shows
Indian stand-up comedy television series
Indian television sketch shows
Zee TV original programming
Television series by Optimystix Entertainment